Irminger is a surname. Notable people with the surname include: 

Carl Friedrich Irminger (1813–1863), Swiss draughtsman, lithographer, and engraver
Ingeborg Plockross Irminger (1872–1962), Danish artist, wife of Valdemar
Valdemar Irminger (1850–1938), Danish painter

See also
Irminger Current
Irminger Sea